Five on the Floor is the fourth studio album released by the Filipino alternative rock band Sandwich in 2006. The album contains the singles "Sugod" (which was inspired by Juan Dela Cruz Band's Kahit Anong Mangyari), "Sunburn", "DVDX" and "Walang Kadala-Dala". This is the first album without Marc Abaya as lead vocalist of the band and the first featuring Mong Alcaraz as guitarist. The title of the album is a pun on the "four on the floor" disco beat.

Track listing

Personnel 
Mike Dizon: Drums, Vocals, videocam
Myrene Academia: Bass, Vocals, Ps2
Diego Castillo: Guitars, Vocals, toys, allen pillows
Mong Alcaraz: Guitars, Vocals, iPod Video
Raimund Marasigan: Vocals, Guitars, Synths, Percs, Melodica

Album Credits 
Recorded & Mixed by: Shinji Tanaka
Mastered by: Zach Lucero @ tweak
Album Packaging Design by: Inksurge.com
Keyboards, percs & additional tracks recorded at: the squid crib
Additional background Vocals: Francis Reyes, Nina, buds & Jasonic

References

Sandwich's EMI page
Five On The Floor EMI's Page

2006 albums
Sandwich (band) albums